Qurt Tappeh (also Romanized as Qūrt Tappeh; also known as Qūt Tappeh) is a village in Torkaman Rural District, in the Central District of Urmia County, West Azerbaijan Province, Iran. At the 2006 census, its population was 316, in 85 families.

References 

Populated places in Urmia County